Plays Duke Ellington is an album by the jazz group the World Saxophone Quartet, released in 1986.

The album marked a departure for the quartet, in that their first six albums had been of music written by the four musicians themselves; this was their first venture into jazz standards.

Reception

In a 5-star review for AllMusic, Scott Yanow wrote: "Although the tunes... are familiar, the interpretations are certainly unusual, showing respect for the original melodies and then coming up with new directions. This is thought-provoking music that serves as the perfect introduction to the unique World Saxophone Quartet."

Critic Robert Christgau stated: "I admire the way the quartet format suggests sonorous magnificence without deploying an embarrassment of riches in its service. Barely touched by deconstructive anarchy, these homages constitute the richest, mellowest music ever recorded by a group whose accomplishment has always been tarnished by a certain theoretical veneer."

The authors of the Penguin Guide to Jazz Recordings wrote that the album "marks a gentle, middle-market turn that did the group no harm at all... The sound is better than usual, with no congestion round about the middle, as on some of the earlier sets."

Writing for The Washington Post, Mike Joyce commented: "Not only is this the band's most accessible album... but it's also the group's crowning glory -- a deeply felt and strikingly original homage to Ellington's genius... It's also hard to imagine Ellington... not being pleased with these results."

Track listing
"Take the 'A' Train" (Strayhorn) – 1:33
"Lush Life" (Strayhorn) – 6:30
"Prelude to a Kiss" (Ellington–Gordon–Mills) – 2:43
"Sophisticated Lady" (Ellington–Mills–Parish) – 4:41
"I Let a Song Go Out of My Heart" (Ellington–Mills–Nemo) – 6:02
"Come Sunday" (Ellington) – 7:36
"In a Sentimental Mood" (Ellington–Kurtz–Mills) – 5:16
"Take the 'A' Train" (Strayhorn) – 4:55

Personnel
Hamiet Bluiett – baritone saxophone
Julius Hemphill – alto saxophone
Oliver Lake – alto saxophone
David Murray – tenor saxophone

References

1986 albums
World Saxophone Quartet albums